Kaouthar Bachraoui (Arabic: كوثر البشراوي) is a Tunisian media personality. She was born  to a Tunisian father and an Italian mother. She started her career at the Tunisian national TV. She joined MBC and presented the program As-Sahra Al-Maftouha (The Open Soirée). She then joined Al Jazeera where she presented the talk show Ishrakat (Reflections) for two years. She later resigned because its then Managing Director Mohammed Jasim Al-Ali  degraded her. She later became part of Al-Arabiya where she presented the weekly program Manarat (Beacons). Bachraoui put an end to her short experience with Al-Arabiya and joined the Arab Thought Foundation. Kouthar Bachraoui's TV programs are cultural. She has Arab nationalist views.

Personal life 
She married once and divorced, and has a son named Youssef.

Kaouthar
Kaouthar is a 2014 documentary film about Kaouthar Bachraoui.

References

Al Arabiya people
Al Jazeera people
Tunisian television personalities
Living people
People from Tunis
Tunisian Arab nationalists
Tunisian people of Italian descent
Tunisian television presenters
Tunisian women television presenters
Year of birth missing (living people)